Phyllodesmium briareum is a species of sea slug, an aeolid nudibranch, a marine gastropod mollusc in the family Facelinidae.

Distribution 
The distribution of Phyllodesmium briareum includes Indo-Pacific and Australia.

Description 
Phyllodesmium briareum uses camouflage and looks like the soft coral Briareum violacea with which it is often found. It grows to 25 mm in length. This species contains zooxanthellae but has cerata of conventional aeolid shape.

Ecology 
Phyllodesmium briareum is reported to feed on a number of species of briareid soft coral including Solenopodium stelleri and Briareum stecheri (sensu MacFadyen, 1936). It is also reported from Pachyclavularia violacea.

References

External links
 

Facelinidae
Gastropods described in 1896